The first season of Reba, an American television sitcom series, aired on The WB from October 5, 2001 to May 10, 2002. The series revolves around the titular character Reba Hart, who deals with her ex-husband, his new girlfriend, and her pregnant daughter Cheyenne and her husband and highschool sweetheart Van Montgomery, as well as raising her two youngest children Kyra and Jake. The series features an ensemble cast including Reba McEntire as Reba Hart, Christopher Rich as Brock Hart, Joanna García as Cheyenne Hart Montgomery, Steve Howey as Van Montgomery, Scarlett Pomers as Kyra Hart, Mitch Holleman as Jake Hart, and Melissa Peterman as Barbra Jean Hart.

The series was created by Allison M. Gibson and executive produced by Gibson, Mindy Schultheis, Michael Hanel, Donald Beck, Christopher Case and Pat Bullard. The show was broadcast during 2001–02 television season on Fridays at 9 pm. The season garnered strong ratings for The WB, averaging 4.2 million viewers. The entire season was released on DVD in North America on December 14, 2004.

Cast and characters
The first season consisted of seven cast members who received star billing. Reba McEntire starred as the titular character Reba Hart, the wisecracking single mother who keeps her family together amidst chaos. Christopher Rich portrays Brock Hart, Reba's vain ex-husband who leaves her for his dental hygienist. Melissa Peterman played Barbra Jean Booker, Brock's pregnant new wife who tries constantly to befriend Reba. Joanna García starred  Reba's daughter and teen mother Cheyenne Hart Montgomery. Steve Howey portrayed high school football star and Cheyenne's husband and father of her child, Van Montgomery. Scarlett Pomers played Kyra Hart, Reba and Brock's rebellious and sarcastic daughter. Mitch Holleman starred as Jake Hart, Reba and Brock's youngest and only son.

In addition to the series regulars, several recurring characters appeared throughout the season. Nell Carter, who starred in the 1980s NBC sitcom Gimme a Break!, appeared in the first three episodes as Dr. Susan Peters, the court ordered therapist appointed to the Hart family. Julia Duffy recurred in the season as Mrs. Hodge, the principal at Cheyenne's high school who objects to Cheyenne being at school while pregnant. Park Overall made several appearances in the season as Reba's best friend Lori Ann, who openly despises Brock and Barbra Jean.

Episodes

Home media

United States ratings

Season 1 averaged 4.2 million viewers and finished as the 129th most watched show of the 2001–02 television season.
All episodes aired at 8:00 pm Fridays on The WB.

References

2001 American television seasons
2002 American television seasons
Reba (TV series) seasons